Viktor Bregner Bromer (born 20 April 1993, in Aarhus) is a Danish swimmer. He won the 200 metre butterfly at the 2014 European Aquatics Championships in 1:55.29, which was a new Danish and Nordic record. He raced in the 2016 Summer Olympics for Denmark, where he did the 200 metre butterfly, finishing 6th. At the 2017 World Championships, he finished 7th. He is sponsored by Speedo.

References

External links
Viktor Bregner Bromer at Team Danmark's website

1993 births
Living people
Danish male butterfly swimmers
Olympic swimmers of Denmark
Swimmers at the 2016 Summer Olympics
Sportspeople from Aarhus